George Edwin Hills (June 30, 1905 – April 3, 1978) was an English-born painter, contractor and political figure in British Columbia. He represented Prince Rupert in the Legislative Assembly of British Columbia in 1953 as a Co-operative Commonwealth Federation (CCF) member.

He was born in Grimsby and came to Canada, settling in Prince Rupert. Hills married Elizabeth Casey. He was an alderman for Prince Rupert, also serving as mayor from 1954 to 1957. Hills was defeated when he ran for reelection to the assembly in 1953 and 1956. He moved to Nanaimo around 1968. He died in 1978.

References 

1905 births
1978 deaths
People from Grimsby
British emigrants to Canada
British Columbia Co-operative Commonwealth Federation MLAs
20th-century Canadian politicians
Mayors of places in British Columbia